Webel may refer to:

 Richard K. Webel (1900-2000), American landscape architect
 Webel Informatics Limited, subsidiary of WEBEL
 Webel Mediatronics Limited, subsidiary of WEBEL